= Revolyutsionny =

Revolyutsionny (masculine), Revolyutsionnaya (feminine), or Revolyutsionnoye (neuter) may refer to:

- Revolyutsionny (settlement), a settlement in Orenburg Oblast, Russia
- Revolyutsionnoye, a village in Kursk Oblast, Russia
